Mohamed Camara  (born 6 January 2000) is a Malian professional footballer who plays as a midfielder for  club Monaco and the Mali national team.

Club career
Camara started his career at AS Real Bamako before joining FC Red Bull Salzburg on five-year deal in 2018.

On 8 January 2019, he was loaned to TSV Hartberg for the rest of the season.

On 18 February 2021, Camara was suspended for three months of all club and international football activities by UEFA, following a doping investigation conducted by UEFA in which Camara tested positive after taking an altitude sickness medicine prescribed by the Malian National Team Doctor. 

On 14 August 2022, Monaco announced that Camara signed a five-year contract with the club.

International career
Camara debuted for the Mali national football team in a 2–1 friendly loss to South Africa on 13 October 2019.

Career statistics

Club

International goals
Scores and results list Mali's goal tally first.

Honours
Mali U20 
 Africa U-20 Cup of Nations: 2019

FC Red Bull Salzburg
Austrian Bundesliga:  2020-21, 2021-22
Austrian Cup: 2020-21, 2021-22

Individual
 Austrian Bundesliga Team of the Year: 2021–22

References

External links

Profile at the AS Monaco FC website

2000 births
Sportspeople from Bamako
Living people
Malian footballers
Mali international footballers
Mali youth international footballers
AS Real Bamako players
FC Liefering players
TSV Hartberg players
FC Red Bull Salzburg players
AS Monaco FC players
Austrian Football Bundesliga players
2. Liga (Austria) players
2021 Africa Cup of Nations players
Expatriate footballers in Austria
Malian expatriate sportspeople in Austria
Expatriate footballers in France
Malian expatriate sportspeople in France
Association football midfielders